Tut Ban (also Romanized as Tūt Bān) is a village in Kuh Hamayi Rural District, Rud Ab District, Sabzevar County, Razavi Khorasan Province, Iran. At the 2006 census, its population was 42, in 14 families.

References 

Populated places in Sabzevar County